1,4-Cyclohexanedimethanol diglycidyl ether is an organic chemical in the glycidyl ether family. It has the formula C14H24O4 and the IUPAC name is 2-4-(oxiran-2-ylmethoxymethyl)cyclohexylmethoxymethyloxirane, and the CAS number 14228-73-0. It is It is REACH registered in Europe. It is an industrial chemical and a key use is in the reduction of viscosity of epoxy resin systems functioning as a reactive diluent.

Synonyms 
The material is known under various names which include:
 2,2'-[1,4-Cyclohexanediylbis(methyleneoxymethylene)]bis[oxirane]
 1,4-Bis(glycidoxymethyl)cyclohexane
 1,4-Bis(hydroxymethyl)cyclohexane diglycidyl Ether
 1,4-Bis[(2,3-epoxypropoxy)methyl]cyclohexane
 1,4-Bis[(glycidyloxy)methyl]cyclohexane
 1,4-Cyclohexanedimethanol diglycidyl Ether

Manufacture 
The manufacturing process involves reacting Cyclohexanedimethanol with epichlorohydrin and a Lewis acid catalyst to form a halohydrin. This is followed by washing with sodium hydroxide in a dehydrochlorination step. This forms the diglycidyl ether. The waste products are water and sodium chloride and excess caustic soda. One of the quality control tests would involve measuring the Epoxy value by determination of the epoxy equivalent weight.

Uses 
As the molecule has oxirane functionality, a key use is reducing the viscosity of epoxy resins. These reactive diluent modified epoxy resins may then be further formulated into which may then be formulated into CASE applications: Coatings, Adhesives, Sealants, Elastomers, and electronic encapsulant. The use of the diluent does effect mechanical properties and microstructure of epoxy resins.

It is also used as a monomer in UV curing systems. In addition it is used to synthesize other molecules such as the acrylated version.

Toxicology 
The material is classed as a skin irritant.

See also 
 Epoxide
 Glycidol

References

Further reading

External links 
 Hexion difunctional epoxy diluents
 Denacol epoxy diluent range
 Cargill Reactive diluents
  AALChem DE 204 CHDMDGE

Glycidyl ethers
Reactive diluents
Cyclohexanes